Miroszowice  is a village in the administrative district of Gmina Lubin, within Lubin County, Lower Silesian Voivodeship, in south-western Poland. 

The village was first mentioned in Old Polish as Micosivici in a 1267 deed.

References

Villages in Lubin County